Partial general elections were held in Belgium on 22 May 1910.
The result was a victory for the Catholic Party, which won 49 of the 87 seats up for election in the Chamber of Representatives.

Under the alternating system, elections were only held in five out of the nine provinces: Antwerp, Brabant, Luxembourg, Namur and West Flanders.

Results
Liberal Adolphe May defeated Catholic Emile de Lalieux de La Rocq in Nivelles and socialist Joseph Bologne defeated liberal Léopold Gillard in Namur. All other representatives were either re-elected, or succeeded by candidates of the same party. Notably, Camille Huysmans (socialist of Antwerp) was elected for the first time.

References

Belgium
1910s elections in Belgium
General
Belgium